Mijanur Rahman Khan is a retired Major general in the Bangladesh Army. He was the Director General of national paramilitary Bangladesh Ansar and Village Defence Party.

Career 
Khan was previously assigned as Director General of national paramilitary force Bangladesh Ansar and Village Defence Party. He also served as Area Commander, Head Quarter Logistics Area. He also served as the Brigade Commander of 52 Infantry Brigade and 88 Infantry Brigade. He had served as colonel Staff of 11 Infantry Division. He previously served as General Officer Commanding (GOC) of 55 Infantry Division and Jessore area commander. He also served as additional director general of Rapid Action Battalion. He was the chairman of Ansar-VDP Unnayan Bank.

References

Living people
Bangladesh Ansar
Bangladesh Army generals
Year of birth missing (living people)